Tottori can refer to:
 Tottori Prefecture, a Japanese prefecture with 613,229 people
 Tottori (city), a Japanese city with 202,015 people
 Tottori Domain, a Japanese domain in the Edo Period
 Tottori Airport
 Tottori Sand Dunes